Ghiyath al-Din Muhammad ibn Rashid al-Din Fadlallah (died 1336) was a Persian bureaucrat under the Ilkhanate, who served as the vizier of the last Ilkhan Abu Sa'id Bahadur Khan from 1327 to 1335. Ghiyath al-Din was the son of Rashid al-Din Hamadani (executed in 1318), the distinguished historian and vizier of the Ilkhans Ghazan Khan and Öljaitü.

Ghiyath al-Din was notably a patron of arts. In the 1330s, various works were dedicated to him by prominent figures such as the poets Awhadi Maraghai, Khwaju Kermani, and Salman Savaji; scholars such as Qazi Adud al-Din Iji; and historians such as Hamdallah Mustawfi and Shabankara'i.

References

Sources
 
  
 
 
 

Year of birth unknown
1336 deaths
Assassinated Iranian politicians
Medieval Iranian people of Jewish descent
14th-century Iranian people
Viziers of the Ilkhanate